Great Owl can refer to:

several species of owl
 the North African pharaoh eagle-owl (particularly in ancient or antiquarian texts)
 the great grey owl
 the American great horned owl
 Wielka Sowa, the highest peak in the Owl Mountains, Poland

 The Great Owl, a character in The Secret of NIMH

Animal common name disambiguation pages